Willy Fitting (25 January 1925 – 26 April 2017) was a Swiss épée and sabre fencer. He won a bronze medal in the team épée event at the 1952 Summer Olympics.

References

External links
 

1925 births
2017 deaths
Swiss male sabre fencers
Swiss male épée fencers
Olympic fencers of Switzerland
Fencers at the 1952 Summer Olympics
Olympic bronze medalists for Switzerland
Olympic medalists in fencing
Medalists at the 1952 Summer Olympics